Arthur James Millhollin (August 23, 1915 – May 23, 1993) was an American character actor.

Early years 
Millhollin was born in Peoria, Illinois.

He grew up in Council Bluffs, Iowa, performing in many school plays, graduated from Thomas Jefferson High School in 1933 and then became active with the Omaha Community Playhouse.

Stage
On Broadway, Millhollin appeared in Saratoga (1959), The Girls in 509 (1958), and No Time for Sergeants (1955).

Television
In 1961, Millhollin also appeared in two sitcoms: as Osborne in "Pity the Poor Working Girl" on ABC's sitcom Margie and as Harold in two episodes, "Mr. Big Shot" and "The Wedding", of CBS's The Ann Sothern Show. Millhollin was cast as  Dr. Heydon in the 1961 episode "Dennis Is a Genius" and as a burglar in "The Uninvited Guest" (1963) on the CBS sitcom Dennis the Menace, starring Jay North in the title role. Near the end of 1961, he guest-starred as Mr. Pinkham in "The Dead End Man," in the series finale of The Investigators. He portrayed a despicable bookkeeper, Ben Otis, in "The Case of the Angry Dead Man" on Perry Mason.

From 1961 to 1962, he guest-starred in different roles on four episodes of CBS's The Many Loves of Dobie Gillis, starring Dwayne Hickman. That year, he played a librarian in the film Bon Voyage!. In 1962, he was cast as Lt. Bronner in the episode "The Handmade Private" of the CBS anthology series GE True, hosted by Jack Webb. In 1963, he was cast in the episode I Dream of Genie of the anthology television series The Twilight Zone. In 1964 he portrayed a sourpuss in the campy movie Get Yourself a College Girl.  In 1965, he appeared on the George Burns sitcom Wendy and Me in the episode "A Bouquet for Mr. Bundy". In 1966, Millhollin appeared as an airline ticket seller in the Get Smart episode "The Amazing Harry Hoo". Also in 1966, he portrayed a bank official in the film The Ghost and Mr. Chicken and a department store manager in the Christmas episode of The Beverly Hillbillies. In 1966 and 1967, he played a hotel clerk and a store official in three episodes of the Marlo Thomas sitcom That Girl. In 1968, Millhollin performed as Willoughby the Llama in the Lost In Space episode "The 
Great Vegetable Rebellion"; and the next year he played Horace Burkhart in "The Con Man", an episode of the CBS series The Doris Day Show.

He also appeared in the TV series Batman as Alfred Slye, a criminal lawyer for Harry, the evil twin brother to Chandell, portrayed by Liberace.

He also appeared in the pilot of The Brady Bunch as Mr. Pringle.

He was also appeared as Humus the funeral director for Felix's bird Albert in a 1970 episode of The Odd Couple.

Death
Millhollin retired to Mississippi, where he died of cancer on May 23, 1993, at the age of 77 in Biloxi.

Filmography

References

External links
 
 

1915 births
1993 deaths
American male television actors
American male film actors
Actors from Peoria, Illinois
Male actors from Los Angeles
People from Biloxi, Mississippi
Deaths from cancer in Mississippi
Male actors from Illinois
20th-century American male actors